Acer amplum is an Asian species of maple found in Vietnam and China.

Acer amplum is a tree up to 25 meters tall with smooth brown or gray bark. Leaves are non-compound, heart-shaped, sometimes unlobed but other times with 3 or 5 lobes, the blade up to 25 cm long and about the same distance in width.

Subspecies
Acer amplum subsp. amplum  - Anhui, Fujian, Guangdong, Guangxi, Guizhou, Hubei, Hunan, Jiangxi, Sichuan, Yunnan, Zhejiang
Acer amplum subsp. bodinieri (H.Lév.) Y.S.Chen - Guangxi, Guizhou, Hunan, Yunnan, Vietnam
Acer amplum subsp. catalpifolium (Rehder) Y.S.Chen - Guangxi, Guizhou, Sichuan
Acer amplum subsp. tientaiense (C.K.Schneid.) Y.S.Chen - Fujian, Jiangxi, Zhejiang

References

External links
line drawings for Flora of China, subsp. amplum
line drawings for Flora of China, subsp. catalpifolium
line drawings for Flora of China, subsp. bodinieri

amplum
Plants described in 1911
Flora of Vietnam
Trees of China